The Nuer: A Description of the Modes of Livelihood and Political Institutions of a Nilotic People is an ethnographical study by the British anthropologist E. E. Evans-Pritchard (1902–73) first published in 1940. The work examined the political and familial systems of the Nuer people in the Anglo-Egyptian Sudan and is considered a landmark work of social anthropology. It was the first of three books authored by Evans-Pritchard on Nuer culture.

The structure of the book
The first two chapters - 'Cattle' and 'Oecology' - provided an environmental setting for the Nuer, cattle pastoralists who carried on limited horticulture. Evans-Pritchard emphasised the extent to which cattle dominated both their economic activity and their social ideals: 

The third chapter, 'Time and Space',

The Nuer was the first of three books which Evans-Pritchard would publish on the Nuer. The others were published as Kinship and Marriage Among the Nuer (1951) and Nuer Religion (1956).

In the book's introduction, Evans-Pritchard warmly thanked the Nuer for the welcome he felt they gave him:

Reception
The Nuer is considered a landmark work of social anthropology and has been discussed extensively. Audrey Richards considered that the book, though "unsatisfying in some respects, it is a brilliant tonic, and in the best sense of the word, an irritating book". This judgment has been echoed by modern academics. Renato Rosaldo has criticised Evans-Pritchard for rendering invisible, in the subsequent body of The Nuer, the colonial power dynamics which enabled his ethnographic research.

References

Further reading

External links
The Nuer (free e-book) at Archive.org

1940 non-fiction books
Anthropology books
English-language books
Non-fiction books about Sudan
Nuer people
Clarendon Press books